Listen Like Thieves is the fifth studio album by Australian rock band INXS. It was released on 14 October 1985. It spent two weeks at number one on the Australian Kent Music Report Albums Chart. Considered an international breakthrough album for the band, it peaked at No. 11 on the United States Billboard 200, No. 24 on the Canadian RPM 100 Albums and top 50 in the United Kingdom.

The album featured the band's first top 5 single in the U.S., "What You Need", and it also won the group the Countdown Music and Video Award for 'Best Video'. Listen Like Thieves also marks the beginning of the group's off-and-on alliance with producer Chris Thomas.

Background 
Listen Like Thieves is the fifth studio album by INXS. The Sydney-based group had formed in 1977 by the three Fariss brothers: Andrew on guitar and keyboards, Jon on percussion and drums, and Tim on guitar, along with Garry Gary Beers on bass guitar, Michael Hutchence as lead vocalist, and Kirk Pengilly on guitar, saxophone, and vocals. Their previous album, The Swing (April 1984), had local chart success peaking at number one on the Australian Kent Music Report Albums Chart and No. 6 in New Zealand. Although appearing on international charts – No. 52 on United States Billboard 200, and No. 27 on the Canadian RPM 100 Albums – INXS wanted to improve their worldwide impact.

After recording their last album in New York and Oxfordshire, they returned to Sydney where they worked with Chris Thomas (Sex Pistols, Pretenders, Roxy Music, Elton John) producing at Rhinoceros Studios.

Recording and production
Listen Like Thieves was recorded over a three-month period at the Rhinoceros studio in Sydney, NSW, Australia. Many of the album's songs were written by the song writing duo of Hutchence and Andrew Farriss. 

As production came close to completion, Thomas told the band that the album was lacking a crucial hit single, so the band members left the studio having just a few days to come up with one last song. "Chris Thomas told us there was still no 'hit'", Farriss later recalled. "We left the studio that night knowing we had one day left and we had to deliver a 'hit'. Talk about pressure." Both Hutchence and Farriss searched through the demos that Farriss had composed throughout the album's production. Out of the remaining demos, Thomas persuaded the duo to focus on one particular demo titled "Funk Song no 13".  "It was great. I thought, 'I could listen to that groove for 10 minutes!' I said, 'Let's work with that groove'", said Thomas. INXS spent the next two days working on the demo track, which would eventually turn out to be the hit single "What You Need", giving the band their first top 5 hit in the U.S.

Reception

Critical response 

AllMusics Stephen Thomas Erlewine noted that with Listen Like Thieves the band "completes its transition into an excellent rock & roll singles band". However "the new configuration only works for three songs", which were its first three singles, "What You Need", "Listen Like Thieves" and "Kiss the Dirt (Falling Down the Mountain)". Despite this commentary, the music critic stated as well that "the album cannot be dismissed" and gave it four out of five stars in his ranking. Australian musicologist Ian McFarlane opined that Listen Like Thieves had "a much harder sound than heard on previous INXS records, but somehow it lacked the pop smarts that had made The Swing so appealing".

Rolling Stones Parke Puterbaugh felt the group were "going for the jugular – or is that the groin?" and with Thomas they "forge an unlikely union between the sonic extremism of Led Zeppelin-style crunch rock and the step-lively beat of disco" such that the album "rocks with passion and seals the deal with a backbeat that'll blackmail your feet".

Track listing

Personnel 
Personnel as listed in the album's liner notes are:

INXS
 Michael Hutchence – vocals
 Andrew Farriss – keyboards, guitar
 Tim Farriss – guitar, synthesizers
 Kirk Pengilly – guitar, saxophones, vocals
 Garry Gary Beers – basses
 Jon Farriss – drums

Additional personnel
 Ray Cooper – percussion on "Same Direction"
 Ann Odell – string arrangements

Production 
 Chris Thomas – producer
 Steve Churchyard – engineer
 INXS – art direction
 Philip Mortlock – design, art, photography
 Andy Rosen – inner spread photography
 Stuart Spence – back cover group photography
 MMA Management – management

Charts and certifications

Weekly charts

Year-end charts

Certifications

Notes

References

INXS albums
1985 albums
Albums produced by Chris Thomas (record producer)
Atlantic Records albums
Mercury Records albums
Warner Music Group albums